James Utterson (26 November 1914 – 6 December 1935) was an English footballer who played as goalkeeper in the Football League for Wolverhampton Wanderers. 

Utterson was playing in a local junior football team Gateshead Celtic when he was recruited for the Northern Ireland club Glenavon, with whom he played a single season, distinguishing himself in matches against the English Football League and the Scottish League. This led to his acquisition, for a reported £500 transfer fee, by Wolves manager Frank Buckley.

He was into his second season with Wolves when he died of heart failure in December 1935 aged 21. He was buried at Merridale Cemetery, Wolverhampton. The later discovery of his gravestone in a dilapidated state led to an appeal to fund its restoration in 2022.

References

1914 births
1935 deaths
English footballers
Association football goalkeepers
English Football League players
Glenavon F.C. players
Wolverhampton Wanderers F.C. players
Association football players who died while playing
Sport deaths in England